Khoriya may refer to:

Khoriya, Janakpur
Khoriya, Sagarmatha